Ramlee is a Malaysian name that may refer to
Ramlee Awang Murshid (born 1967), Malaysian novelist
Nasir P. Ramlee (born 1953), Malaysian film actor, director, singer and composer, son of P. Ramlee
P. Ramlee (1929–1973), Malaysian film actor, director, singer and composer
Taman P. Ramlee, a township near Kuala Lumpur named after P. Ramlee
Shazalee Ramlee (born 1994), Malaysian-Australian football midfielder